Akhbar in Arabic is the plural of khabar, meaning news or, in Classical Arabic, reports about significant past events. The Arabic term occurs in the titles of many newspapers and other media, and may refer to:

Journals

Middle East and North Africa
Akhbar el-Yom, an Egyptian weekly newspaper, founded 1944
Al Akhbar (Egypt), an Egyptian daily, founded 1952
Akhbar Al-Adab, an Egyptian literary weekly newspaper
Al Akhbar (Lebanon), a Lebanese daily newspaper, founded 2006
Akhbar Al Khaleej, a Bahrain daily newspaper
Akhbar Al Arab, a daily newspaper published in the United Arab Emirates
'Akhbar ha-'Ir (lit., City Mouse ;also a pun on the Arabic term), an Israeli weekly entertainment guide

South Asia
Akhbarul Hind, an Arabic-language fortnightly newspaper published in Mumbai, India
Akhbar-e-Jahan, an Urdu-language weekly family magazine from Karachi, Pakistan
Al Akhbar (Pakistan), an Urdu-language daily from Pakistan
Khalsa Akhbar Lahore, a Punjabi-language weekly Sikh newspaper, published 1886-1905
Koshur Akhbar, a Kashmiri-language online newspaper from Indian Jammu and Kashmir

Other
Akhbar (Shia Islam), in Shia Islam refers to the transmitting of hadith. It is the foundation of Akhbari Twelver Shia Islam
Akhbari, Twelver Shī‘a Muslims who reject the use of reasoning in deriving verdicts

See also
 Akbar (disambiguation)
 Khabar (disambiguation)